WesternGeco is a geophysical services company. It is headquartered in Schlumberger House on the property of London Gatwick Airport in Crawley, West Sussex, in Greater London.


Background
The company provides reservoir imaging, monitoring, and development services.  The company, a business segment of Schlumberger, offers 3D and time-lapse seismic surveys, electromagnetic surveys, and multicomponent surveys for delineating prospects and reservoir management. It also provides geophysical, land and transition-zone acquisition, marine acquisition, electromagnetics, and data processing and reservoir seismic services.

The company was formed by the merger in 2000 of two of the world's largest seismic contractors, Western Geophysical (founded in 1933) and Geco-Prakla. Schlumberger, owners of Geco-Prakla paid cash to Baker Hughes, which then owned Western, for a 70% stake in a joint venture of the combined companies. In May 2006, Schlumberger bought out Baker Hughes' 30% stake for a reported $2.4 billion, making WesternGeco one of its subsidiaries.

Exit seismic data acquisition
In January 2018, Schlumberger CEO Paal Kibsgaard announced that Schlumberger would be exiting the seismic data acquisition business, both onshore and offshore, while retaining its multiclient data processing and interpretation segments. This decision followed the bankruptcy filings of several competitors in the seismic services sector.

In August 2018, the seismic data acquisition business was sold to Shearwater GeoServices.

Head office
WesternGeco has its head office and its Europe/African offices in the Schlumberger House, a  building on the grounds of Gatwick Airport in Crawley, England, in Greater London.

References

External links 

 WesternGeco Website

British companies established in 2000
Business services companies of the United Kingdom
Business services companies established in 2000
Oilfield services companies
Joint ventures
Seismological observatories, organisations and projects
Schlumberger
Companies based in Crawley